Mechanical universe can refer to:

 Mechanism (philosophy), theory that the universe is best understood as a system composed entirely of matter in motion under a complete and regular system of laws
 Clockwork universe theory, compares the operation of the physical universe to the workings of a mechanical clock
 The Mechanical Universe, a 52-part telecourse introducing university-level physics